Devorn Jorsling (born 27 December 1983 in Morvant) is a Trinidadian footballer who currently plays for Defence Force.

Club career

Early career
Jorsling played extensively in the TT Pro League, initially with W Connection and Caledonia AIA, but most prominently Defence Force, with whom he played for 8 seasons.

He was part of the Defence Force squad which won T&T Pro League title in 2010/2011, won a First Citizens Cup winner's medal in 2009, won the Trinidad and Tobago Cup in 2005, and won the T&T Pro League Golden Boot Award in 2008, tallying 21 goals. He also played for the team in their 2002 CONCACAF Champions' Cup first round loss to Pachuca.

Orlando City
On 27 January 2011 Jorsling signed with Orlando City S.C. of the USL Pro league in the United States.

Caledonia AIA
After his stint with Orlando City in 2011, Jorsling returned to Trinidad to play for the national team in November 2011. He also returned to the TT Pro League, playing for Caledonia AIA, as a striker.

International career
Jorsling made his debut for the Trinidad and Tobago national team in 2007, and scored his first international goal on 19 September 2010 in a 1–0 friendly win over Antigua and Barbuda. He also scored a hat trick in his team's 6–2 win over St. Vincent and the Grenadines in the 2010 Caribbean Championship

International goals

Honours

Orlando City
USL Pro (1): 2011

References

External links
Soca Warriors

1983 births
Living people
Trinidad and Tobago footballers
Trinidad and Tobago international footballers
W Connection F.C. players
TT Pro League players
Morvant Caledonia United players
Defence Force F.C. players
Orlando City SC (2010–2014) players
USL Championship players
Expatriate soccer players in the United States
Association football forwards